East Halton railway station was located on Skitter Road north of East Halton, Lincolnshire, England.

The station was built by the Barton and Immingham Light Railway under the auspices of the Great Central Railway. The line's primary purpose was to enable workers to get to and from Immingham Dock which was being built at the time the line was opened. The typical journey time to the dock was fifteen minutes.

The station was the only one on the line built with two brick faced platforms, though the second track and platform were removed in later years. In 1954 the platform facilities consisted of a seat, a corrugated iron shelter a station sign reading East Halton Halt and two lamps.

Shortly after closure the track was lifted for about 100 yards from the junction at Goxhill, leaving the line through the station as a long siding which was sometimes used to store redundant wagons. Some time later the track was lifted through the station almost to Killingholme Admiralty Platform. In 2015 the line of route was still plain to see.

References

Sources

External links
 Services from New Holland Disused Stations UK
 The station on a 1930 OS map National Library of Scotland
 The station on a 1948 OS map npe maps
 The station and line Rail Map Online
 The station and section of line railwaycodes
 Two photos of the station yccrp

Disused railway stations in the Borough of North Lincolnshire
Former Great Central Railway stations
Railway stations in Great Britain opened in 1911
Railway stations in Great Britain closed in 1963